Beaucarnea hiriartiae is a plant in the family Asparagaceae, native to Mexico. The species is named for the botanist Patricia Hiriart Valencia.

Description
The bark is smooth. The inflorescences feature yellow-white flowers.

Distribution and habitat
Beaucarnea hiriartiae is endemic to Mexico, where it is confined to the area around Cañon del Zopilote in Guerrero.

Conservation
Beaucarnea hiriartiae has been assessed as critically endangered on the IUCN Red List. It is threatened by conversion of its habitat for agriculture, roads and urban development. It is also threatened by illegal harvesting for the ornamental plant trade. The species' range includes a protected area.

References

hiriartiae
Flora of Guerrero
Plants described in 1992